Europa FC Women is a football club from Gibraltar which plays in the Gibraltar Women's Football League. As with all other clubs in the territory, Europa FC currently shares the Victoria Stadium on Winston Churchill Avenue, with matches in the Women's League generally taking place on Pitch 2. The side are connected to Europa in the Gibraltar National League.

History
The side formed in 2012 as College Europa Women shortly before the Gibraltar Football Association joined UEFA, amidst a boom in interest in the sport at the time. In what was, at the time, a 4 team league, Europa struggled behind the established forces of Manchester 62, Lincoln Red Imps and Lions Gibraltar, even as Manchester 62 disbanded their team and the league was reduced to 3 teams. However, the club have slowly become more competitive over the years. In 2015 the team changed its name to Europa FC Women in line with the men's team breaking away from the College sports club.

Honours
Gibraltar Women's Football League
Runners-up: 2020–21, 2021–22, 2022–23
Women's Rock Cup
Runners-up: 2018

Current squad

References

2013 establishments in Gibraltar
Women's football clubs in Gibraltar
Association football clubs established in 2013